Cecchetto is a surname. Notable people with the surname include:

Claudio Cecchetto (born 1952), Italian record producer
Marta Cecchetto (born 1978), Italian model
Paolo Cecchetto (born 1967), Italian cyclist
Renato Cecchetto (born 1951), Italian actor

Italian-language surnames